Devil May Care may refer to:

Music
 Devil May Care, an album by Bob Dorough, 1956
 "Devil May Care", the title song, covered by Jamie Cullum on Pointless Nostalgic, 2002
 Devil May Care (album), by Teri Thornton, 1961
 Devil May Care, an album by Claire Martin, 1993
 "The Devil May Care (Mom & Dad Don't)", a song by the Brian Jonestown Massacre from Give It Back!, 1997
 Devil May Care (EP) or the title song, by Susperia, 2005
 The Devil May Care, an album by 67 Special, 2007
 Devil May Care, an EP by Iron Steel, 2008

Other uses
 Devil-May-Care, a 1929 film musical starring Ramón Novarro
 Devil May Care (Peters novel), a 1977 novel by Elizabeth Peters
 Devil May Care (Faulks novel), a 2008 James Bond novel by Sebastian Faulks
 Devil May Care (horse) (2007–2011), an American Thoroughbred racehorse
 Devil May Care (TV series), a 2021 American adult animated comedy series

See also
 Devil May Cry, a video game series